Pseudeurostus is a genus of spider beetles in the family Ptinidae. There are about seven described species in Pseudeurostus.

Species
These seven species belong to the genus Pseudeurostus:
 Pseudeurostus anemophilus (Chobaut, 1901)
 Pseudeurostus apenninus (Baudi di Selve, 1874)
 Pseudeurostus bordei (Sainte-Claire Deville, 1921)
 Pseudeurostus frigidus (Boieldieu, 1854)
 Pseudeurostus hilleri (Reitter, 1877) (Japanese spider beetle)
 Pseudeurostus kelleri Brown, 1959
 Pseudeurostus submetallicus (Fairmaire, 1862)

References

Further reading

 
 
 
 

Bostrichoidea
Articles created by Qbugbot